William W. McDonald is an American rancher, and conservationist. He is executive director of the Malpai Borderlands Group.
He was a 1998 MacArthur Fellow.

Life
He is the fifth generation on the Sycamore Canyon Ranch, which was homesteaded in 1907. He graduated from Arizona State University and then began managing the ranch full-time. The Sycamore Ranch is in Southeastern Arizona.

Works

References

External links
 

Ranchers from Arizona
American conservationists
MacArthur Fellows
Arizona State University alumni
Living people
Year of birth missing (living people)